Hannah Olive Sjerven (born June 11, 1998) is an American professional basketball player for the Sydney Flames of the Women's National Basketball League (WNBL). She played  for the Minnesota Lynx in the Women's National Basketball Association (WNBA). She played college basketball at New Mexico and South Dakota.

College career
Sjerven was rated as the 131st ranked player in the nation in the 2016 recruiting class. Sjerven signed with New Mexico out of high school. Following her first season at New Mexico in 2016–17, when she played 13 games Sjerven announced her transfer to South Dakota.

Professional career

Minnesota Lynx
On April 11, 2022, Sjerven was drafted 28th overall by the Minnesota Lynx in the 2022 WNBA draft. Sjerven appeared in two preseason games for the Lynx tallying 8 points vs. Las Vegas and had 6 rebounds vs. Washington

On May 3, 2022, Sjerven was waived from the Lynx training camp and did not make the opening day roster. Sjerven returned on May 13, 2022, on a hardship contract On May 22, 2022, Sjerven was released from her hardship contract as Natalie Achonwa returned from injury.

WNBA career statistics

Regular season

|-
| align="left" | 2022
| align="left" | Minnesota
| 3 || 0 || 3.0 || .000 || .000 || .000 || 0.0 || 0.0 || 0.0 || 0.3 || 0.0 || 0.0
|-
| align="left" | Career
| align="left" | 1 year, 1 team
| 3 || 0 || 3.0 || .000 || .000 || .000 || 0.0 || 0.0 || 0.0 || 0.3 || 0.0 || 0.0

References

External links
South Dakota Coyotes bio

1998 births
Living people
American women's basketball players
Basketball players from Minnesota
Forwards (basketball)
New Mexico Lobos women's basketball players
South Dakota Coyotes women's basketball players
Minnesota Lynx draft picks
Minnesota Lynx players
People from Rogers, Minnesota